The Columns, also known as the McDowell Columns Building, is a historic school building located at Murfreesboro, Hertford County, North Carolina.  It was built about 1852, and is a three-story, Greek Revival style stuccoed brick building with a low hip roof and octagonal belvedere.  The front facade features a massive portico supported by eight Doric order columns.  It was built to house the Chowan Baptist Female Institute, later Chowan University.  The building houses the school's administrative offices.

It was listed on the National Register of Historic Places in 1971.

Gallery

References

Historic American Buildings Survey in North Carolina
School buildings on the National Register of Historic Places in North Carolina
Greek Revival architecture in North Carolina
School buildings completed in 1852
Buildings and structures in Murfreesboro, North Carolina
National Register of Historic Places in Hertford County, North Carolina
1852 establishments in North Carolina
Chowan University